Oleksandr Dmytrovych Kozhevnikov (born 17 April 2000) is a Ukrainian professional footballer who plays as a right winger.

Career
Kozhevnikov is a product of his native Vorskla Poltava youth sportive school system.

In July 2019 he was transferred to another Ukrainian Premier League side FC Mariupol and made his debut for in the Ukrainian Premier League as a second half-time substituted player in the drawing away match against FC Rukh Lviv on 20 November 2020. In March 2021 he returned to Vorskla Poltava.

References

External links
 
 

2000 births
Living people
Sportspeople from Poltava
Ukrainian footballers
Ukrainian expatriate footballers
FC Mariupol players
FC Vorskla Poltava players
FC Hirnyk-Sport Horishni Plavni players
JK Narva Trans players
Ukrainian Premier League players
Ukrainian First League players
Meistriliiga players
Ukraine youth international footballers
Association football forwards
Expatriate footballers in Estonia
Ukrainian expatriate sportspeople in Estonia